Doug Bourne (22 December 1908 – 30 July 1980) was an  Australian rules footballer who played with St Kilda in the Victorian Football League (VFL).

Notes

External links 

1908 births
1980 deaths
Australian rules footballers from Victoria (Australia)
St Kilda Football Club players
Prahran Football Club players